Riding to Fame is a 1927 American silent sports drama film directed by Barry Barringer and starring George Fawcett, Rosemary Theby and Gladys McConnell.

Cast
 George Fawcett as Old Man Randolph
 Rosemary Theby as Marge
 Gladys McConnell as Rose Randolph
 Arthur Rankin as Jackie
 Robert Emmett Tansey as Spec
 Henry Sedley as Joe Riordan
 Lafe McKee as Dr. Lorentz

References

Bibliography
 Robert B. Connelly. The Silents: Silent Feature Films, 1910-36, Volume 40, Issue 2. December Press, 1998.

External links
 

1927 films
1927 drama films
1920s English-language films
American silent feature films
Silent American drama films
American black-and-white films
Films directed by Barry Barringer
1920s American films
English-language drama films